Khanji is an occupational surname literally meaning "innkeeper" ("khan keeper"; -ij is an occupational suffix). Notable people with the surname include:

Muhammad Dilawar Khanji (1918-1989), Pakistani politician
Ghulam Moinuddin Khanji (1911-2003), ruler of Manavadar State
One of many Nawabs of Junagarh
One of many rulers of Balasinor State
Ahmad Mayez Khanji  (born 1967), Syrian boxer

Occupational surnames